Clinton Hill may refer to:

Places in the United States
Clinton Hill, Brooklyn, New York, a neighborhood
Clinton Hill Historic District
Clinton Hill, Newark, New Jersey, a neighborhood

People
Clinton Hill (artist) (1922–2003), New York School artist
Clint Hill (Secret Service) (born 1932), Secret Service agent present at the assassination of John F. Kennedy
Clinton Hill (athlete) (born 1980), Australian athlete and Olympic medalist

Hill, Clinton